Sacred Groove is a George Lynch album from 1993. It contains a diverse range of tracks from different styles of music, for example, the instrumental Tierra Del Fuego has a significant Latin feel to it. There are four instrumentals and six songs on the US release.  The Japanese release has an additional instrumental as well as a bluesy live track.  A notable instrumental on the album is "Love Power from the Mama Head", which shows off much of Lynch's unique playing style.

Track listing
There are ten tracks on the US release and twelve tracks on the Japanese release of this album:

References

1993 albums
Elektra Records albums